The 2003 World Weightlifting Championships were held in Vancouver, Canada, from 14 November to 22 November. The men's 77 kilograms division was staged on 17 and 18 November.

Schedule

Medalists

Records

Results

References
Weightlifting World Championships Seniors Statistics, Page 49 
Results 

2003 World Weightlifting Championships